The 2018 TCR Italy Touring Car Championship is the fourth season of the ITCC to run under TCR regulations and the 32nd season since the national touring car series was revived in 1987 as the Campionato Italiano Turismo. The series will begin at the Autodromo Enzo e Dino Ferrari in April and conclude at the Autodromo Nazionale Monza in October.

Teams and drivers

Calendar and results
The 2018 calendar was announced on 26 October 2017, with a single round scheduled to be held in France as the only round held outside Italy.

TCR Italy Drivers' Standings

† – Drivers did not finish the race, but were classified as they completed over 75% of the race distance.

References

External links
 

2018 in Italian motorsport
Italian Touring Car Championship